Fresno Traction Company operated electric trams in Fresno, California, from 1903 to 1939.  Earlier horsecar tracks were improved and electrified under consolidated ownership which passed to Southern Pacific Transportation Company operation in 1910. A separate Fresno Interurban Railway shared some lines along Fresno city streets.

Preceding horsecar operations
After incorporation of the City of Fresno in 1885, the Fresno Street Railroad began operating horsecars in 1889 from H Street along Mariposa Street, K Street and Tulare Street to the east city limit. The street railway system was later extended to the south city limit along F Street, Santa Clara Avenue, C Street and Elm Avenue. The Fresno City, Belmont, and Yosemite Railroad was granted a separate charter to build a 20-pound T rail line to the north city limit along J Street, Tuolumne Street and O Street. The Fresno Railroad built a 20-pound T rail line along I street to the south city limit, and along Ventura Avenue to the Fresno County fairgrounds.

Expansion
The Fresno Traction Company was incorporated in 1903 authorized to build  of electric railroads connecting Fresno to Selma, Trimmers Springs, Wawona, Central, and Washington Colonies. Electric operations commenced with three single truck Hammond cars purchased from the United Railroads of San Francisco, and five California cars built by W. L. Holman Car Company. After  of new track had been laid, these expansion plans were curtailed by the 1906 San Francisco earthquake. By 1909 the Fresno Avenue subway had been built under the steam railroad line, and lines along Tulare Street, Fresno Avenue, and J Street had been improved with double track. A car barn and repair shop was built at the end of Tulare Street to hold ten new double-truck Paye cars built by American Car Company.

Southern Pacific (SP) purchased a controlling stock interest in 1910 and replaced most of the older rail with heavier 75-pound rail. The Roeding Park branch line was completed in 1912, and four longer Paye cars were purchased from the Jewett Car Company. A line was completed to the company-owned Fresno Beach in 1915. Nineteen Birney cars were placed in operation after the war, and the original Hammond cars were replaced by twelve lightweight double-truck cars built by St. Louis Car Company in 1925. Individual lines were abandoned as service contracted through the 1930s; and all streetcar operations ended on 20 May 1939.

Roster

Fresno Interurban
The Fresno Interurban Railway was incorporated in 1914 to build a  electric railway from Fresno to Clovis, California. Construction of that line proceeded slowly eastward from Fresno with a Hall-Scott gasoline motor car providing service over the completed portion. The  Hall-Scott car #1 seated 43 passengers. While construction of the line to Clovis was underway, an electrified branch line was put in operation between J Street and Fresno State College with two 48-passenger cars (#102 & #103) leased from the Peninsular Railway. When the Hall-Scott car broke down in September, 1917, Santa Fe Railroad #2157 0-6-0 was leased to continue service over the main line. Passenger service to Fresno State College ended when the interurban declared bankruptcy in 1918; and Santa Fe purchased the company in 1922. The incomplete line toward Clovis was improved in 1924 to serve as a freight branch of the Santa Fe Railroad.

References

Defunct town tramway systems by city
Transportation in Fresno, California
Railway companies established in 1903